The 1959 Lehigh Engineers football team was an American football team that represented Lehigh University during the 1959 NCAA College Division football season. Lehigh finished sixth in the Middle Atlantic Conference, University Division, and last in the Middle Three Conference.

In their 14th year under head coach William Leckonby, the Engineers compiled a 4–5 record. Edward Murphy and Alfred Richmond were the team captains.

In conference play, Lehigh missed fourth place in the University Division by half a game, with a record of 2–3 against conference opponents, compared to Bucknell's 3–3 and Rutgers' 2–2. The Engineers went 0–2 against the Middle Three, losing to both Rutgers and Lafayette.

Lehigh played its home games at Taylor Stadium on the university campus in Bethlehem, Pennsylvania.

Schedule

References

Lehigh
Lehigh
Lehigh Mountain Hawks football seasons
Lehigh Engineers football